Starsailor may refer to:

Starsailor (band), an indie rock band from Chorley, England
Starsailor (album), a 1970 album by Tim Buckley